Michael Nyman is the third album release by Michael Nyman and the second with the Michael Nyman Band, having previously contributed tracks to new music compilations.  Most of the music was material from early films by Peter Greenaway such as "Bird List Song" from The Falls, sung by Lucie Skeaping, and music from Act of God and Tree.

It also includes his first concert work for the band, "In Re Don Giovanni", which is built around a brief 15-bar phrase in the accompaniment of Leporello's catalog aria in Wolfgang Amadeus Mozart's Don Giovanni, which was also released as a single under the title Mozart.  Nyman says he discovered the piece playing the aria on his piano in the style of Jerry Lee Lewis, which "dictated the dynamic, articulation and texture of everything I've subsequently done."

The album should not be confused with Criterion's 1995 promo CD (CRIT CD002), Michael Nyman, which featured previously released material, none of which was from this album, which was released as Piano Records Sheet 005, and which has yet to be issued on CD. It was announced for release in 2009, in connection with Nyman's 65th birthday.  This was missed, and it has been announced again for release on November 21, 2011. The CD was released in January 2012, including both the UK and Japanese cover art but not including the "Last But One Of The Last But One" non-LP b-side from the "In Re Don Giovanni" single.

It was published by Chester Music/Michael Nyman Ltd, and produced by David Cunningham.

Band members 
 Rory Allam - clarinet
 Alexander Balanescu - violin
 Anne Barnard - french horn
 Ben Grove - guitar, bass guitar
 John Harle - saxophone
 Nick Hayley - rebec, violin
 Ian Mitchell - clarinet
 Michael Nyman - piano
 Elisabeth Perry - violin
 Steve Saunders - trombone
 Roderick Skeaping - rebec, violin
 Keith Thompson - flute, piccolo, recorder, saxophone
 Doug Wootton - banjo

Guest musicians 
 Peter Brötzmann - bass clarinet, tenor saxophone
 Evan Parker - soprano saxophone
 Lucie Skeaping - soprano

Track listing 
 "Bird Anthem" (from Act of God)  2:37
 "Initial Treat" (from Tree) 2:50
 "Secondary Treat" (from Tree) 1:27
 "In Re Don Giovanni" 2:48
 "Waltz in F" 5:55
 "Bird List Song" (from The Falls) 4:19
 "M-Work" 21:09

"Waltz in F" was reissued on the compilation, Century XXI UK: N-Z  It is the only track to be issued on CD in its album performance.  The main waltz theme, without the jazz improvisations, was the basis of "Waltzing the Bird" on À la folie.  "In Re Don Giovanni" and the instrumental "Bird List" appeared on Live in new, live versions.  A new recording of In Re appears on the 2008 album Mozart 252.  "Initial Treat", the opening titles from Tree, is part of Five Orchestral Pieces for Opus Tree, which can be heard in its complete form by Jon Gibson and other artists at The Kitchen on the 1979 edition of From the Kitchen Archives.

The single Mozart/Webern was released on Les Disques du Crépuscule. On that single, "Mozart" is "In Re Don Giovanni"; "Webern" is "Secondary Treat".  A third track, "Untitled", is "Initial Treat".

References

1980s classical albums
1981 albums
Michael Nyman albums